Forfexicaris valida is a species of Lower Cambrian arthropod, the only species in the family Forfexicarididae. It is known from only two specimens from the Maotianshan shale .

Description
It had a pair of stalked eyes, and a pair of great appendages, which closely resemble those of Occacaris.

References

Prehistoric arthropod genera
Cambrian arthropods
Maotianshan shales fossils